Harsidhi is a small town and one of the 27 blocks in East Champaran district in the Indian state of Bihar. It is located 30 kilometers from the district headquarters Motihari.

References

See also
 Harsidhi (Vidhan Sabha constituency)

Cities and towns in East Champaran district